SOCOM is an abbreviation which refers to United States Special Operations Command.

SOCOM may also refer to:

Weapons 
 .458 SOCOM, a moderately large round designed for a specialized upper receiver that can be mounted on any AR-15 lower receiver
 Firearms for USSOCOM's Offensive Sidearm Weapon System (OSWS) trials:
 Colt OHWS
 Heckler & Koch Mark 23 Mod 0
 SOCOM 16 and SOCOM II, variants of the Springfield Armory M1A rifle

Video games
SOCOM U.S. Navy SEALs, a series of third-person shooter video games

See also
 SOC (disambiguation)